Virgin Valley High School is a high school in Mesquite, Nevada under the jurisdiction of the Clark County School District. Up until the opening of Beaver Dam High School in Beaver Dam, Arizona in the fall of 2004, high school students from the Littlefield Unified School District across the Arizona state line attended high school at Virgin Valley.

Notable alumni
Cresent Hardy, Nevada Assemblyman
Jerry Montgomery, American football coach

References

External links
 Virgin Valley High School website

High schools in Clark County, Nevada
Organizations established in 1911
Public high schools in Nevada
1911 establishments in Nevada
Educational institutions established in 1911